S.W.A.T.: Under Siege is a 2017 American action film directed by Tony Giglio. It is the third installment of the S.W.A.T. film series and was released direct-to-video on August 1, 2017.

Plot 
The DEA enlists the help of the Seattle SWAT to storm a drug cartel's waterfront warehouse to capture cartel members and seize a shipment of drugs.  A firefight ensues and when it is over, several DEA agents and one SWAT team member are dead.  When the container holding the suspected drug shipment is found and opened, the team is surprised to find a man chained inside. After taking him back to SWAT headquarters, the compound is assaulted by a group of terrorists who want the man from the container, claiming he is their partner. The mysterious man calls himself "The Scorpion" and the SWAT team believe him to be a fugitive. They try to move him, but realise that an inside agent is working with the terrorists. The leader of the team, Hall, asks Scorpion what he has that they want. He reveals himself to be a spy.

The building's lockdown codes are hacked and the terrorists storm the building in large numbers. Two SWAT members are killed and they realise Ward, one of their members, is working with them. Scorpion and Hall kill the two terrorist leaders and wait for backup. The SWAT leader, Dwyer, and Hall talk and Scorpion hands them a microchip, saying he's tired of running. Hall realises that Dwyer is the inside agent for the terrorists and a fight ensues. She shoots Scorpion and flees with Hall in pursuit. She is caught and arrested and Hall is asked to identify the Scorpion's body. Scorpion uses a dead inmate as a body double, but Hall still identifies him to let Scorpion go free. He returns home to enjoy the fireworks with his family.

Cast
 Sam Jaeger as Travis Hall
 Adrianne Palicki as Ellen Dwyer
 Michael Jai White as "Scorpion"
 Matthew Marsden as Lars
 Kyra Zagorsky as Sophia Gutierrez
 Ty Olsson as Ward
 Olivia Cheng as Chu
 Garvin Cross as Drug Enforcement Agent Weir
 Zahf Paroo as Hooks
 Aren Buchholz as York
 Lisa Chandler as "Phoenix"
 Mike Dopud as Franklin
 Monique Ganderton as Simone
 Chris Gauthier as Elson
 Marci T. House as Angela Jefferson
 Pascale Hutton as Carley
 Omari Newton as Benson
 Leo Raine as Diego

References

External links
 
 

S.W.A.T. (franchise)
2017 action thriller films
2017 crime thriller films
2017 crime action films
2017 films
American action thriller films
American crime action films
American crime thriller films
Direct-to-video sequel films
Original Film films
Films directed by Tony Giglio
Destination Films films
Independence Day (United States) films
Sony Pictures direct-to-video films
2010s English-language films
2010s American films